David Allan Sonnenfeld (born July 31, 1953) is an American sociologist and Professor of Sociology and environmental policy at the State University of New York College of Environmental Science and Forestry, known for his work in the field of ecological modernisation.

Biography 
Sonnenfeld was born to Joseph Sonnenfeld (1929-2014), Professor of Geography at the Texas A&M University. Sonnenfeld obtained his undergraduate degree from the Robert D. Clark Honors College at the University of Oregon in 1973 and his Ph.D. in sociology in 1996 from the University of California, Santa Cruz, where his graduate studies focused on environmental social science, the sociology of development (Southeast Asia), and historical and field research methods.

Sonnenfeld started his academic career as associate professor of sociology at Washington State University. He is also a research associate and periodic guest professor with the Environmental Policy Group at Wageningen University and Research Centre.

In September 2007 he joined the State University of New York College of Environmental Science and Forestry, where he was appointed professor and chair of environmental studies. He is co-editor of Ecological Modernisation Around the World: Perspectives and Critical Debates. In 2006, he co-edited the book Challenging the Chip.

Work 
Forest policy issues led to pursuits in the late 1980s, providing further impetus for forest-industry related research. As an Intercampus Exchange Student at the University of California, Berkeley in 1991, Sonnenfeld joined a network of scholars studying Indonesian forestry issues, beginning his foray into the study of social and environmental transformation in Southeast Asia and elsewhere.

In 1993-94, he was a Visiting Research Fellow at the Centre for Resource and Environmental Studies at the Australian National University, from where he based his field research on the adoption of environmental technologies in the pulp and paper industries of Australia, Indonesia, Malaysia, and Thailand.

Selected publications

References

External links 
 

1953 births
Living people
American non-fiction environmental writers
American sociologists
Environmental sociologists
University of Oregon alumni
University of California, Santa Cruz alumni
State University of New York faculty
Academic staff of Wageningen University and Research
Writers from Syracuse, New York
Activists from Syracuse, New York